Prairie Creek Township may refer to:

 Prairie Creek Township, Logan County, Illinois
 Prairie Creek Township, Vigo County, Indiana
 Prairie Creek Township, Dubuque County, Iowa, in Dubuque County, Iowa
 Prairie Creek Township, Merrick County, Nebraska
 Prairie Creek Township, Hall County, Nebraska
 Prairie Creek Township, Nance County, Nebraska

Township name disambiguation pages